Freeland Community School District is a school district headquartered in Freeland, Michigan in northwest Saginaw County. It is a part of the Saginaw Intermediate School District and serves the Freeland area, including Tittabawassee Township, the northern portion of Thomas Township, and the westernmost sections of Kochville Township. Its schools include Freeland Learning Center, Freeland Elementary School, Freeland Middle School, and Freeland High School. For the 2017–2018 school year, there were 1,969 students attending Freeland Schools.

Freeland Learning Center 
Freeland Learning Center is the oldest school building in the district, built in 1959, and expanded since then.  As of 2021–2022 school year, the Learning Center houses Young 5's, Kindergarten, and 1st grade classes.

Freeland Elementary School 
Freeland Elementary School also houses the District administration office.  As of the 2021–2022 school year, the Elementary school houses students in 2nd-5th grade on the Elementary schedule as well as 6th grade class that operates on the Middle School schedule.

Freeland Middle School/ Freeland High School 
Freeland Middle School houses grades 7th and 8th.  Freeland High school houses grades 9th-12th.  The high school campus includes a football stadium, a soccer stadium, and a 500-person auditorium.  The facilities are shared with the Middle School which is collocated on the Webster Road campus.

References

External links

 Freeland Community School District

School districts in Michigan
Saginaw Intermediate School District